Archibald McLardie (1889 – 25 December 1915) was a Scottish professional footballer who played in the Scottish League for St Mirren as an outside forward.

Personal life 
McLardie attended John Neilson Institution, Paisley Grammar School, University of Glasgow and later worked for McLay, Murray & Speirs in Glasgow and as a lawyer for the Carron Company in Falkirk. On 5 June 1915, ten months after the outbreak of the First World War, McLardie was commissioned into the Argyll and Sutherland Highlanders as a second lieutenant. Prior to the war, he had served as a territorial with the Cameronians (Scottish Rifles). McLardie was serving at Gallipoli when he was killed by shellfire near Krithia Nullah on 25 December 1915. He was buried at Pink Farm Cemetery.

Career statistics

References 

Scottish footballers
1915 deaths
British Army personnel of World War I
British military personnel killed in World War I
1889 births
Footballers from Paisley, Renfrewshire
Argyll and Sutherland Highlanders officers
Scottish Football League players
St Mirren F.C. players
Queen's Park F.C. players
Association football outside forwards
Cameronians soldiers
Alumni of the University of Glasgow
People educated at Paisley Grammar School
Burials at Pink Farm Commonwealth War Graves Commission Cemetery